Seventy-Second Brave is the fifth album by the Keef Hartley Band.

Track listing

Deram SDL 9 (UK), XDES 18065 (US)

 "Heartbreakin' Woman" (Junior Kerr) – 4:18
 "Marin County" (Chris Mercer) – 3:55
 "Hard Pill to Swallow" (Pete Wingfield) – 5:40
 "Don't You Be Long" (Kerr) – 5:16
 "Nicturns" (C. Crowe) – 2:07
 "Don't Sign It" (Mercer) – 4:24
 "Always Thinking of You" (C. Crowe) – 4:37
 "You Say You're Together Now" (Gary Thain) – 3:42
 "What It Is" (C. Crowe) – 1:19

Personnel

Keef Hartley Band
 Keef Hartley – drums, cover illustration
 Junior Kerr – guitar, vocals
 Pete Wingfield – piano, vocals
 Gary Thain – bass guitar, vocals
 Chris Mercer – tenor saxophone, baritone saxophone
 Nick Newell – alto saxophone, flute
 Mick Weaver – organ

Technical
 Keef Hartley Band – producer
 John Burns – engineer, Island Studios
 Roy Baker – engineer, Trident Studios
 Harry Isles – photography

References 

1972 albums
Deram Records albums
Keef Hartley Band albums
Albums recorded at Trident Studios